Georgy Savvich Grammatikopulo (1930, Sukhumi – 1992) was a Soviet football player. A native of Sukhumi, Georgia, Grammatikopulo played as a striker.

He started his professional football career at FC Dinamo Tbilisi during the 1949 season. He then joined Spartak Tbilisi, however, after he only had three appearances during the whole season, he joined Dynamo Leningrad in 1952. In the 1954 season, Grammatikopulo was hired by Dynamo Kiev, where he spent the next five years. After a short return to Dinamo Tbilisi in 1960, he joined FC Dinamo Sukhumi in his hometown of Sukhumi. He retired in 1962.

In 1956 Voinov played couple of games for the Ukraine at the Spartakiad of the Peoples of the USSR.

In 1992, after the dissolution of the Soviet Union, Grammatikopulo died.

References

External links 
Memorial page dedicated to Grammatikopulo at fcdinamo.su

1930 births
1992 deaths
Sportspeople from Sukhumi
Georgian people of Greek descent
Soviet people of Greek descent
Footballers from Abkhazia
Soviet footballers
FC Dinamo Tbilisi players
FC Dinamo Sukhumi players
FC Dynamo Kyiv players
FC Dynamo Saint Petersburg players
Pontic Greeks
Association football forwards